Hawkstowe railway station is located on the Mernda line in Victoria, Australia. It serves the north-eastern Melbourne suburb of South Morang, and it opened on 26 August 2018.

History

Hawkstowe station opened on 26 August 2018, when the railway line was extended from South Morang to Mernda, as part of the Mernda Rail project. The station was not originally planned as part of the project. However, as a result of pressure from the community, the station was included in the plan for the extension. It is elevated, providing views of the surrounding area, including the adjacent Plenty Gorge Park.

The name of the station comes from a nearby property named "Hawkstowe", once owned by J.H. Walker, who was the founder of Walker's Biscuits.

Platforms and services

Hawkstowe station has one island platform with two faces. It is serviced by Metro Trains' Mernda line services.

Platform 1:
  all stations and limited express services to Flinders Street

Platform 2:
  all stations services to Mernda

Transport Links

Dysons operates three routes via Hawkstowe station, under contract to Public Transport Victoria:
 : Whittlesea – Northland Shopping Centre
 : Mernda station – RMIT University Bundoora Campus
 : Mernda station – RMIT University Bundoora Campus

References

External links

Railway stations in Melbourne
Railway stations in Australia opened in 2018
Railway stations in the City of Whittlesea